Hommelvik Station is a railway station located in the village of Hommelvik in the municipality of Malvik in Trøndelag county, Norway.

The station is located on the Nordland Line, and it is served hourly by the Trøndelag Commuter Rail service to Steinkjer Station and Trondheim Central Station.  The unstaffed station is operated by SJ Norge.

History
.
The station was built as part of the Meråker Line railway line and it opened on 17 October 1881. The current station building was built in 1958.

References

External links
 Entry at Norwegian Railway Club's Station Database

Malvik
Railway stations in Trøndelag
Railway stations on the Nordland Line
Railway stations on the Meråker Line
Railway stations opened in 1881
1881 establishments in Norway